Stanley F. "Stan" Lombardo (alias Hae Kwang; born June 19, 1943) is an American Classicist, and former professor of Classics at the University of Kansas.

He is best known for his translations of the Iliad, the Odyssey, and the Aeneid (published by the Hackett Publishing Company). The style of his translations is a more vernacular one, emphasizing conversational English rather than the formal tone of some older American English translations of classical verse. Lombardo designs his translations to be performed orally, as they were in ancient Greece. He also performs the poems, and has recorded them as audio books. In performance he also likes to play the drums, much like Ezra Pound.

Biography
Of Italian ancestry, Lombardo is a native of New Orleans. He has a BA from Loyola University in New Orleans, an MA from Tulane University, and a PhD from the University of Texas (1976). In 1976 he joined the faculty at the University of Kansas, where he served as department chair for fifteen years and taught Greek and Latin at all levels, as well as general courses on Greek literature and culture.  He was appointed University of Kansas Honors Program director in 2004.

Lombardo is a Zen master in the Kwan Um School of Zen. Along with his wife, Judith Roitman, who is a retired professor of mathematics at the 
University of Kansas and a published poet, he was a founding member of the Kansas Zen Center.

Bibliography

Parmenides and Empedocles (1982) Grey Fox Press.  
Sky Signs: Aratus' Phaenomena (1983) North Atlantic Books.  
Callimachus: Hymns, Epigrams, Select Fragments, with Diane Rayor (1987) Johns Hopkins University Press.  
Plato: Protagoras (1992) Hackett Publishing Company.  
Hesiod: Works and Days and Theogony (1993) Hackett Publishing Company.  
Lao-Tzu: Tao Te Ching, with Stephen Addiss (1993) Hackett Publishing Company.  
Homer: Iliad (1997) Hackett Publishing Company.  
Homer: Odyssey (2000) Hackett Publishing Company.  
Sappho: Poems and Fragments (2002) Hackett Publishing Company.  
Virgil: Aeneid (2005) Hackett Publishing Company.  
Abelard & Heloise: The Letters and Other Writings, with William Levitan and Barbara Thorburn (2007) Hackett Publishing Company.  
Zen Source Book, with Stephen Addiss and Judith Roitman (2008) Hacket Publishing.  
Dante: Inferno (2008) Hackett Publishing Company.  
Ovid: Metamorphoses (2010) Hackett Publishing Company. 
Statius: Achilleid (2015) Hackett Publishing Company. 
Sappho: Complete Poems and Fragments (2016) Hackett Publishing Company. 
Dante: Purgatorio (2016) Hackett Publishing Company. 
Dante: Paradiso (2017) Hackett Publishing Company. 
Horace: Odes & Carmen Saeculare (2018) Hackett Publishing Company. 
Gilgamesh (2019) Hackett Publishing Company. 
Bhagavad Gita (2019) Hackett Publishing Company.

Audiobooks and Abridgements
The Essential Homer (2000) Hackett Publishing Company.  
The Essential Iliad (2000) Hackett Publishing Company.  
Iliad (2006) (Audiobook) Parmenides Publishing.  
Odyssey (2006) (Audiobook) Parmenides Publishing. 
The Essential Iliad (2006) (Audiobook) Parmenides Publishing.  
The Essential Homer (2006) (Audiobook) Parmenides Publishing.  
The Essential Aeneid (2006) Hackett Publishing Company.  
The Essential Odyssey (2007) Hackett Publishing Company. 
The Essential Metamorphoses (2011) Hackett Publishing Company.

See also
 English translations of Homer#LombardoIl

References

Sources

Hedges, Chris. The Humbling of Odysseus. New York Times Book Review. July 9, 2000.

Further reading
Michael Leddy interviews Stanley Lombardo. Jacket Magazine. Jacket 21, February 2003.

External links

1943 births
American classical scholars
American Buddhists
American former Christians
American people of Italian descent
American Zen Buddhist spiritual teachers
Classical scholars of the University of Kansas
Homeric scholars
Living people
Loyola University New Orleans alumni
Translators to English
Tulane University alumni
University of Kansas faculty
University of Texas at Austin alumni
Translators of Homer
Translators of Virgil
Translators of Dante Alighieri